Eustrephus is a monotypic genus in the family Asparagaceae, subfamily Lomandroideae.

Eustrephus latifolius, commonly named wombat berry, is the sole species of evergreen vines which grow naturally in Malesia, the Pacific Islands and eastern Australia. They grow in sclerophyll forest, woodland, heathlands, shrublands, gallery forest and on the margins of and in rainforests.

All leaf veins are equally distinct. Flowers are pink to mauve or white. The yellow-orange, globose, capsules of  diameter contain numerous black seeds set in a white aril. The variation in the shapes of the leaves has resulted in the creation of numerous infraspecific taxa over the years, none of which are recognised by most present-day systematists.

Uses
The tubers are eaten baked, and have an earthy sweet flavour.

The 1889 book 'The Useful Native Plants of Australia’ records that Eustrephus latifolius is a "climber produces sweet though only small tubers, which, however, are probably capable of enlargement through culture (Mueller)."

References

Bushfood
Flora of Queensland
Flora of New South Wales
Flora of Victoria (Australia)
Asparagales of Australia
Monotypic Asparagaceae genera
Lomandroideae